The Women's Engineering Society is a United Kingdom professional learned society and networking body for women engineers, scientists and technologists. It was the first professional body set up for women working in all areas of engineering, predating the Society of Women Engineers by around 30 years.

History

The society was formed on 23 June 1919, after the First World War, during which many women had taken up roles in engineering to replace men who were involved in the military effort. While it had been seen as necessary to bring women into engineering to fill the gap left by men joining the armed forces, the government, employers, and trades unions were against the continuing employment of women after the war. The Restoration of Pre-War Practices Act 1919 gave soldiers returning from World War I their pre-war jobs back and meant many women could no longer work in roles they were employed to fill during the war.

This led a group of seven women, including Lady Katharine Parsons, her daughter Rachel Parsons, Lady Margaret Moir, Laura Annie Willson, Eleanor Shelley-Rolls;  Janetta Mary Ornsby and Margaret Rowbotham to form the Women's Engineering Society, with the aim of enabling women to gain training, jobs and acceptance in engineering fields. The Society's first Secretary was Caroline Haslett. 

Early members in the 1920s and 1930s included Verena Holmes, Hilda Lyon and Margaret Partridge. Pilot and engineer, Amy Johnson, who was the first woman to fly solo from the United Kingdom to Australia, was a member of WES and served as president between 1935-37. A registry of members from 1935 shows there were members from across the world, such as the United States of America, including sociologist and industrial engineer Lillian Gilbreth, and Germany, including Asta Hampe and Ilse Knot-ter Meer. 

The Society celebrated its 95th year in 2014 with the launch of International Women in Engineering Day (INWED) on 23 June 2014. To this day the Society continues to organise INWED and set the annual theme. The Society celebrated its centenary in 2019 with the launch of the WES Centenary Trail, a project to highlight the historic stories of women engineers.

Work and campaigns
Society members have advised the UK government on evolving employment practices for women. Constituted as a professional society with membership grades based on qualification and experience, the society promotes the study and practice of engineering and allied sciences among women.

WES is represented by groups. The work of the groups focuses on:
 support to members and women engineers in general,
 encouragement of women to study engineering and take up engineering careers,
 promotion of corporate gender diversity,
 speaking as the collective voice of women engineers.

 

The society produces the journal The Woman Engineer  which was edited by Caroline Haslett in its early years. The journal contained technical articles in its early years but now gives a view of work in engineering disciplines and women's involvement in them. The digital archive of the journal is held by the Institution of Engineering and Technology.

The Women's Engineering Society holds an annual conference, a student conference and regional workshops and networking events.

Outreach to schools 
In 1969, President Verena Holmes left a legacy to fund an annual lecture to inspire school girls. Run by the Verena Holmes Trust, the first lecture tour was in 1969 during the first UK Women in Engineering Year. It was delivered at various venues to children aged nine to eleven to encourage their interest in engineering,  The lectures were given by leading engineers with Mary Kendrick giving the lecture in 1981. 

Members provided the 'technical women power' for the Women in Science and Engineering (WISE) buses that were launched following the WISE Year in 1984, an initiative that continued into the 1990s. 

In 2014 WES set up an outreach programme called Magnificent Women (and their flying machines) which replicates the work that women did during the First World War in making aircraft wings, and this was aimed at secondary school girls. The programme was discontinued in 2018 as the Society refocused its campaigns on supporting the engineering industry to be more inclusive.

MentorSET 
MentorSET is a mentoring scheme for engineers, inspired by the WES President Petra Gratton (née Godwin) in 2000. The scheme was a collaborative project with national network of women scientists (AWISE). It was a mentoring scheme to help women in their career and to support them back into engineering after a career break. MentorSET has been funded by DTI, the UK Resource Centre for Women in SET, and BAE Systems. In 2015 the MentorSET programme was relaunched with funding from DECC, now BEIS and Women in Nuclear and is now relevant to women working in science and technology as well as engineering.

Membership
Members are drawn from women who have entered the profession through routes varying from traditional apprenticeship to higher education leading to graduate and further degrees. The participation of male engineers in the society is encouraged.

Current membership exceeds 2,000 individuals and over 120 corporate and education partners.

Governance 
The Women's Engineering Society is a charitable company, governed by the President and the Board of Directors of the Company, who are also Trustees of the Charity. Day to day operations are delegated to the Chief Executive Officer and staff.

Presidents

Notable historical members

See also
History of women in engineering in the United Kingdom
Atalanta Ltd
Electrical Association for Women

References

External links 
 
 The Woman Engineer journal archives
 MentorSET
 International Women in Engineering Day

 
Engineering societies based in the United Kingdom
Institution of Engineering and Technology
Organisations based in Hertfordshire
Organizations established in 1919
Science and technology in Hertfordshire
Stevenage
Women in engineering
Women's organisations based in the United Kingdom
1919 establishments in the United Kingdom